Alice Marie Angèle Pasquier (November 16, 1833 – May 25, 1914), better known by her stage name Madame Pasca and also known as Alix-Marie Pasquier, was a French stage actress.

Life and career 
Pasca was born on November 16, 1833 in Lyon to Jeanne-Marie-Antoinette-Eugénie Morin and Louis-Joseph Séon, a merchant. She took singing lessons from François Delsarte, but had limited vocal range and was encouraged by Delsarte to pursue acting instead.

She married M.Pasquier in 1855 and when a widow she first appeared as an actress at the Gymnase" in Paris in 1864.

As an actress, Pasca received significant critical attention. The Gentleman's Magazine and Historical Review'' described her as the "queen, by right of self-culture, of the Salon."

She died on May 25, 1914 in Paris.

References 

1833 births
1914 deaths
French stage actresses
19th-century French actresses
20th-century French actresses
Actresses from Lyon